Mount McGladrey is located on the border of Alberta and British Columbia on the Continental Divide. It was named in 1914 after McGladrey very little is known about the person.

See also
 List of peaks on the Alberta–British Columbia border
 Mountains of Alberta
 Mountains of British Columbia

References

McGladrey
McGladrey
McGladrey